Ranularia springsteeni is a species of predatory sea snail, a marine gastropod mollusk in the family Cymatiidae.

Description

Distribution
This marine species occurs off New Caledonia.

References

 Beu, A.G., 1998. Indo-West Pacific Ranellidae, Bursidae and Personidae (Mollusca: Gastropoda). A monograph of the New Caledonian fauna and revision of related taxa. Mémoires du Muséum national d'Histoire naturelle 178: 1-255
 Beu, A. (2010). Catalogue of Tonnoidea.

Cymatiidae
Gastropods described in 1987